This article contains information about the literary events and publications of 1931.

Events
January 10 – A rare copy of Edgar Allan Poe's Al Aaraaf, Tamerlane, and Other Poems and first editions of The Scarlet Letter and Moby-Dick are stolen from New York Public Library by Samuel Dupree, on behalf of a crooked New York antiquarian book dealer, Harry Gold.
January 26 – The play Green Grow the Lilacs by Cherokee playwright Lynn Riggs, opens on Broadway. It is later adapted as Oklahoma! by Rodgers and Hammerstein.
March 27 – The English novelist Arnold Bennett dies of typhoid in London, shortly after a visit to Paris, where he drank local water in an attempt to prove it was safe.
April 11 – Gerald Brenan and Gamel Woolsey make a form of marriage in Rome.
June 1 – The Near v. Minnesota case in the Supreme Court of the United States affirms the principle that prior restraint is unconstitutional.
July 4 – James Joyce marries his long-time partner Nora Barnacle at Kensington register office in London.
October 4 – The Dick Tracy comic strip first appears, created by cartoonist Chester Gould.
October 5 – The first U.K. performance of Oscar Wilde's tragedy Salome (1891) is given at the Savoy Theatre, London, with Nancy Price as producer and as Herodias, and her daughter Joan Maude in the title role.
November – Federico García Lorca is appointed by the leftist Second Spanish Republic as director of a touring theatre company, Teatro Universitario La Barraca (The Shack), charged with taking a portable stage into rural areas to introduce audiences to classical Spanish theatre without charge.
unknown dates
The publisher Hamish Hamilton is founded by Jamie Hamilton in London.
Alice's Adventures in Wonderland is banned in Hunan, China, for anthropomorphism.
The Marquis de Sade's The 120 Days of Sodom (Les 120 Journées de Sodome), written in 1785, has its first publication in a scholarly edition as a literary text.

New books

Fiction
Shmuel Yosef Agnon – The Bridal Canopy
Margery Allingham – Police at the Funeral
Roberto Arlt – Los lanzallamas (The Flame-Throwers)
E. F. Benson – Mapp and Lucia
Arna Bontemps – God Sends Sunday
Pearl S. Buck – The Good Earth
Morley Callaghan – No Man's Meat
Nellie Campobello – Cartucho
John Dickson Carr
Castle Skull
The Lost Gallows
Willa Cather – Shadows on the Rock
Sigurd Christiansen – To levende og en død
Agatha Christie – The Sittaford Mystery
N. D. Cocea – Vinul de viață lungă
Freeman Wills Crofts – Mystery in the Channel
A. J. Cronin – Hatter's Castle
E. E. Cummings – CIOPW
Sergiu Dan – Dragoste și moarte în provincie
 Clemence Dane – Broome Stages
Detection Club – The Floating Admiral
Pierre Drieu La Rochelle – Will O' the Wisp
Lord Dunsany – The Travel Tales of Mr. Joseph Jorkens
Joseph Jefferson Farjeon – The House Opposite
William Faulkner
Sanctuary
These 13
Jessie Redmon Fauset – The Chinaberry Tree
Carlo Emilio Gadda – La madonna dei filosofi
Anthony Gilbert – The Case Against Andrew Fane
Emma Goldman – Living My Life
Caroline Gordon – Penhally
Maxim Gorky – The Life of Klim Samgin (Жизнь Клима Самгина, Zhizn' Klima Samgina; third volume, translated as Other Fires) 
Dashiell Hammett – The Glass Key
James Hanley – Boy
Serge-Simon Held – La Mort du fer (The Death of Iron)
Harold Heslop – Red Earth
Georgette Heyer – The Conqueror
Robert Hichens – The First Lady Brendon
James Hilton (published under the name "Glen Trevor") – Murder at School
Knud Holmboe – Desert Encounter
Fannie Hurst – Back Street
Francis Iles – Malice Aforethought
Carolyn Keene – The Secret of Shadow Ranch
Margaret Kennedy – Return I Dare Not
Irmgard Keun – Gilgi – eine von uns (Gilgi – One of Us)
Halldór Laxness –  (O Thou Pure Vine)
 E. C. R. Lorac – The Murder on the Burrows
Marie Belloc Lowndes – Letty Lynton
Compton Mackenzie 
 Buttercups and Daisies
 Our Street
W. Somerset Maugham – Six Stories Written in the First Person Singular
Pierre Mac Orlan – La Bandera
Nancy Mitford – Highland Fling
Thomas Mofolo – Chaka
Leopold Myers – Prince Jali
 E. Phillips Oppenheim – Up the Ladder of Gold
Ilf and Petrov – The Little Golden Calf (Золотой телёнок, Zolotoy telyonok)
Andrei Platonov – The Foundation Pit (Котлован, Kotlovan, written)
Anthony Powell – Afternoon Men
Ellery Queen – The Dutch Shoe Mystery
Erich Remarque – The Road Back
E. Arnot Robertson – Four Frightened People
Sax Rohmer - Daughter of Fu Manchu
Rafael Sabatini – Captain Blood ReturnsVita Sackville-West – All Passion SpentJohn Monk Saunders – Single LadyDorothy Sayers – Five Red HerringsGeorge S. Schuyler – Black No MoreNevil Shute – Lonely RoadGeorges Simenon – Pietr-le-Letton (book format)
Upton Sinclair – Roman HolidayThomas Sigismund Stribling – The ForgeEleanor Smith – FlamencoStanislas-André Steeman — The Six Dead MenCecil Street – Tragedy on the LinePhoebe Atwood Taylor – The Cape Cod MysterySigrid Undset – Wild Orchid Henry Wade – No Friendly DropEdgar Wallace – The Man at the CarltonHugh Walpole – Judith ParisNathanael West – The Dream Life of Balso Snell Ethel Lina White – Put Out the LightVirginia Woolf – The WavesP. G. WodehouseBig MoneyIf I Were YouFrancis Brett Young – Mr. and Mrs. PenningtonChildren and young people
Jean de Brunhoff – Histoire de Babar, le petit éléphant (translated as The Story of Babar)
John Buchan – The Blanket of the DarkEdgar Rice BurroughsA Fighting Man of MarsTarzan the InvincibleErich Kästner – The 35th of May, or Conrad's Ride to the South Seas (Der 35. Mai)Arthur Ransome – SwallowdaleRuth Plumly Thompson – Pirates in Oz (25th in the Oz series overall and the 11th written by her)

Drama
Clifford Bax – The Venetian
Charles Bennett – Sensation
James Bridie – The Anatomist
Chen Liting – Put Down Your Whip (放下你的鞭子)
Noël Coward – Post-Mortem (published)
Federico García Lorca – When Five Years Pass (Así que pasen cinco años, written)
Jean Giraudoux – Judith
  Walter C. Hackett – 
 The Gay Adventure
 Good Losers (with Michael Arlen)
 Take a Chance
Ian Hay 
Mr Faint-Heart
The Midshipmaid
Ronald Jeans 
 Can the Leopard...?
 Lean Harvest
Edward Knoblock – Grand Hotel
André Obey
Noé (Noah)
Le Viol de Lucrèce (The Rape of Lucretia)
Eugene O'Neill – Mourning Becomes Electra
Marcel Pagnol – Fanny
J. B. Priestley and Edward Knoblock – The Good Companions
Ahmed Shawqi – Qambeez (Cambyses)
Dodie Smith – Autumn Crocus
Gladys Bronwyn Stern – The Man Who Pays The Piper
John Van Druten 
Hollywood Holiday
London Wall
Sea Fever
There's Always Juliet
Ödön von Horváth – Tales from the Vienna Woods (Geschichten aus dem Wiener Wald)
Edgar Wallace – The Old Man
Thornton Wilder – The Long Christmas Dinner
Carl Zuckmayer – The Captain of Köpenick (Der Hauptmann von Köpenick)

Non-fiction
Samuel Beckett – ProustAdrian Bell – Silver LeyMarc Bloch – Les Caractères originaux de l'histoire rurale françaiseArthur Bryant – King Charles the SecondHerbert Butterfield – The Whig Interpretation of HistoryW. Chapman and V. C. A. Ferraro – A New Theory of Magnetic StormsAli Akbar Dehkhoda et al. – Dehkhoda Dictionary of the Persian language
Julius Evola – The Hermetic TraditionDion Fortune – Spiritualism in the Light of Occult ScienceJohn Middleton Murry – Son of Woman: The Story of D. H. LawrenceIrma S. Rombauer – The Joy of CookingHelen Thomas – World Without EndEdmund Wilson – Axel's CastleBirths
January 4 – José Triana, Cuban poet (d. 2018)
January 6
E. L. Doctorow, American author (died 2015)
P. J. Kavanagh, English poet, novelist, and broadcaster (died 2015)
January 9 – Algis Budrys, Lithuanian-American science fiction author (died 2008)
January 10 – Peter Barnes, English playwright (died 2004)
January 17 – Mark Brandis (Nikolai von Michalewsky), German journalist and science fiction author (died 2000)
January 20 – Sawako Ariyoshi, Japanese novelist (died 1984)
January 24 – Leonard Baker, American historian and Pulitzer-winning author (died 1984)
January 27
Allan W. Eckert, American historian and novelist (died 2011)
Shirley Hazzard, Australian author (died 2016)
John Hopkins, English screenwriter (died 1998)
Mordecai Richler, Canadian author (died 2001)
February 2 – Walter Burkert, German writer (died 2015)
February 9 – Thomas Bernhard, Dutch-born Austrian author (died 1989)
February 11 – Larry Merchant, American author and boxing commentator
February 12 – Janwillem van de Wetering, Dutch-American crime writer (died 2008)
February 18
Johnny Hart, American cartoonist (died 2007)
Toni Morrison, American writer and Nobel Prize winner (died 2019)
February 19 – Robert Sobel, American business writer (died 1999)
March 2 – Tom Wolfe, American novelist (died 2018)
March 11 
 Janosch, German children's author and illustrator
 Rupert Murdoch, Australian-born publisher
March 16 – Augusto Boal, Brazilian theater director and writer (died 2009)
March 22 – Leslie Thomas, Welsh novelist (died 2014)
March 26 – Alison Prince, English-born Scottish children's writer and biographer (died 2019)
April 1 – Rolf Hochhuth, German dramatist (died 2020)
April 12 – Chico Anysio, Brazilian actor, comedian, writer and composer (died 2012)
April 15 – Tomas Tranströmer, Swedish poet and translator (died 2015)
April 21 – Gabriel de Broglie, French historian
April 29 – Robert Gottlieb, American editor
May 2 – Ruth Fainlight, American-born poet, short story writer, translator and librettist
May 7 – Gene Wolfe, American science fiction and fantasy writer (died 2019)
May 23 – Barbara Barrie, American actress and writer
June 12 – Robin Cook (Derek Raymond), English crime novelist (died 1994)
June 21 – Patricia Goedicke, American poet (died 2006)
June 26 – Colin Wilson, British novelist and philosopher (died 2013)
July 4 – Sébastien Japrisot, French novelist and screenwriter (died 2003)
July 6 – Emily Nasrallah, Lebanese writer and women's rights activist (died 2018)
July 7 – David Eddings, American novelist (died 2009)
July 10
Nick Adams, American screenwriter (died 1968)
Julian May, American science fiction author (died 2017)
Alice Munro, Canadian short story writer 
July 14 – E. V. Thompson, English novelist (died 2012)
July 15 – Clive Cussler, American thriller writer and underwater explorer (died 2020)
July 17 – Caroline Graham, English playwright, screenwriter and novelist
August 2 – Karl Miller, British writer and literary editor (died 2014)
August 12 – William Goldman, American novelist and screenwriter (died 2018)
August 14 – Frederic Raphael, American-born English screenwriter, novelist and non-fiction author
August 16 – Marion Patrick Jones, Trinidadian writer (died 2016)
August 22 - Maurice Gee, New Zealand novelist
September 14 – Ivan Klíma, Czech novelist and dramatist
September 15 – Kalim Siddiqui, Pakistani-born British writer and Islamic activist (died 1996)
September 22
Ashokamitran (Jagadisa Thyagarajan), Indian fiction writer (died 2017)
Fay Weldon, English novelist
October 8 – Dennis Silk, American-born English writer on literature and cricket, and first-class cricketer (died 2019)
October 13 – Janice Elliott, English novelist and children's writer (died 1995)
October 19 – John le Carré (David John Moore Cornwell), English spy novelist (died 2020)
October 22 – Ann Rule, American true-crime writer (died 2015)
October 23 – James McNeish, New Zealand novelist, playwright and biographer (died 2016)
November 3 – Arun Sarma, Assamese playwright and novelist (died 2017)
November 18 – Nikoloz Janashia, Georgian historian (died 1982)
November 28 – Tomi Ungerer, Alsatian illustrator and writer (died 2019)
December 2 – Nigel Calder, British science writer (died 2014)
December 15 – Klaus Rifbjerg, Danish writer (died 2015)
December 31 – Bob Shaw, Irish science-fiction writer (died 1996)

Deaths
January 3 – L. Adams Beck, Irish writer (born 1862)
January 12 – Henry Gauthier-Villars, French writer (born 1859)
January 26 – Graça Aranha, Brazilian diplomat and writer (born 1868)
March 27 – Arnold Bennett, English novelist (born 1867)
April 4 – André Michelin, French originator of Michelin Guides (born 1853)
April 10 – Khalil Gibran, Lebanese-born American poet (born 1883)
June 29 – Nérée Beauchemin, French-Canadian poet (born 1850)
July 2 – Harald Høffding, Danish philosopher (born 1843)
August 1 – Bertha McNamara, German-born Australian pamphleteer and bookseller (born 1853)
August 15 – Delfín Chamorro, Spanish poet and language teacher (born 1863)
August 27 – Frank Harris, Irish-born American author and editor (born 1856)
August 31 – Hall Caine, Manx novelist and dramatist (born 1853)
September 9 – Matilda Cugler-Poni, Romanian poet (born 1851)
September 24 – Ethel Hillyer Harris, author (born 1859)
September 30 – Jane Meade Welch, American historian (born 1854)
October 13 – Ernst Didring, Swedish novelist (born 1868)
October 21 – Arthur Schnitzler, Austrian dramatist (born 1862)
October 27 – Lucas Malet (Mary St Leger Kingsley), English novelist (born 1852)
November 3 – Juan Zorrilla de San Martín, Uruguayan epic poet (born 1855)
November 5 – Ole Edvart Rolvaag, Norwegian American writer (born 1876)
November 19 – Xu Zhimo (徐志摩), Chinese poet (air accident, born 1897)
 December 5 – Vachel Lindsay, American poet (born 1879)
December 10 – Enrico Corradini, Italian novelist, essayist and journalist (born 1865)
December 26 – Melvil Dewey, American inventor of library classification system (born 1851)
December 27 – Alfred Perceval Graves, Irish author and collector of songs and ballads (born 1846)
December 31 – Ieronim Yasinsky, Russian writer, poet and essayist (born 1850

Awards
Chancellor's Gold Medal: Robert Gittings
James Tait Black Memorial Prize for fiction: Kate O'Brien, Without My CloakJames Tait Black Memorial Prize for biography: J. Y. R. Greig, David HumeNewbery Medal for children's literature: Elizabeth Coatsworth, The Cat Who Went to HeavenNobel Prize in literature – Erik Axel Karlfeldt
Pulitzer Prize for Drama: Susan Glaspell, Alison's HousePulitzer Prize for Poetry: Robert Frost, Collected PoemsPulitzer Prize for the Novel: Margaret Ayer Barnes, Years of Grace''

References

 
Years of the 20th century in literature